Dario Marinović (born 24 May 1990), is a Croatian futsal player who plays for Jimbee Cartagena and the Croatia national futsal team.

References

External links
UEFA profile

1990 births
Living people
Futsal forwards
Sportspeople from Dubrovnik
Croatian men's futsal players
ElPozo Murcia FS players